The spotted minnow (Dionda melanops) is a species of ray-finned fish in the family Cyprinidae.
It is endemic to Mexico.

References

Dionda
Freshwater fish of Mexico
Fish described in 1856
Taxa named by Charles Frédéric Girard